Club Baloncesto Villa de Los Barrios was a professional basketball team based in Los Barrios, Andalusia that played in the Soldado Samuel Aguilar, in the LEB league until 2009, when the senior team ceased activity.

Season by season

Trophies and awards

Individual awards
LEB Oro MVP
Ricardo Guillén – 2007

External links
Federación Española de Baloncesto
Villa de Los Barrios Official Page

Los Barrios
Los Barrios
Los Barrios
Defunct basketball teams in Spain
Basketball teams disestablished in 2010
Los Barrios